The patriarchal age is the era of the three biblical patriarchs, Abraham, Isaac and Jacob, according to the narratives of Genesis 12–50 (these chapters also contain the history of Joseph, although Joseph is not one of the patriarchs). It is preceded in the Bible by the primeval history and followed by The Exodus.

Jewish tradition
The Bible contains an intricate pattern of chronologies from the creation of Adam, the first man, to the reigns of the later kings of ancient Israel and Judah. Based on this chronology and the Rabbinic tradition, ancient Jewish sources such as Seder Olam Rabbah date the birth of Abraham to 1948 AM (c. 1813 BCE) and place the death of Jacob in 2255 AM (c. 1506 BCE).

Early biblical archaeology
Out of this heated debate between the various theories of biblical criticism and traditional, religious interpretations was born biblical archaeology, a form of archaeology different from others in that it sought not to discover and interpret mute evidence, but to validate or invalidate the historicity of the patriarchs and the events surrounding their lives, as described within the Bible.

The most eminent of early biblical archaeologists was William F. Albright, who believed that he had identified the patriarchal age in the period 2100–1800 BC, the Intermediate Bronze Age, the interval between two periods of highly developed urban culture in ancient Canaan. Albright argued that he had found evidence of the sudden collapse of the previous Early Bronze Age culture, and ascribed this to the invasion of migratory pastoral nomads from the northeast whom he identified with the Amorites mentioned in Mesopotamian texts. According to Albright, Abraham was a wandering Amorite who migrated from the north into the central highlands of Canaan and the Negev with his flocks and followers as the Canaanite city-states collapsed. Albright, E. A. Speiser and Cyrus Gordon argued that although the texts described by the documentary hypothesis were written centuries after the patriarchal age, archaeology had shown that they were nevertheless an accurate reflection of the conditions of the 2nd millennium BC. According to John Bright "We can assert with full confidence that Abraham, Isaac and Jacob were actual historical individuals."

Modern biblical archaeology
Following Albright's death, his interpretation of the Patriarchal age came under increasing criticism: such dissatisfaction marked its culmination with the publication of The Historicity of the Patriarchal Narratives by Thomas L. Thompson and Abraham in History and Tradition by John van Seters. Thompson, a literary scholar, argued on the lack of compelling evidence that the patriarchs lived in the 2nd millennium BCE, and noted how certain biblical texts reflected first millennium conditions and concerns, while Van Seters examined the patriarchal stories and argued that their names, social milieu, and messages strongly suggested that they were Iron Age creations. Van Seter and Thompson's works were a paradigm shift in biblical scholarship and archaeology, which gradually led scholars to no longer consider the patriarchal narratives as historical. Some conservative scholars attempted to defend the Patriarchal narratives in the following years, but this position has not found acceptance among scholars.

By the beginning of the 21st century, archaeologists had given up hope of recovering any context that would make Abraham, Isaac or Jacob credible historical figures.

See also
 Nuzi texts
 Prehistory

References

Book of Genesis
Biblical archaeology
Prehistory
Historical eras